The Miles Islands are an island group located in the Coronation Gulf, south of Victoria Island, in the Kitikmeot Region, Nunavut, Canada. Other island groups in the vicinity include the Aiyohok Islands, Akvitlak Islands, Bate Islands, Duke of York Archipelago, Nauyan Islands, Outcast Islands, and Sisters Islands.

References

 Miles Islands at the Atlas of Canada

Islands of Coronation Gulf
Uninhabited islands of Kitikmeot Region